Peak power may refer to:

 the maximum power rating of electronic device 
 Power handling in audio equipment
 Watt-peak in electrical generation systems
 Peaking power plant of electric utilities